Frank Parker defeated Bill Talbert 14–12, 6–1, 6–2 in the final to win the men's singles tennis title at the 1945 U.S. National Championships.

Seeds
The seeded players are listed below. Frank Parker is the champion; others show the round in which they were eliminated.

  Frank Parker (champion)
  Andres Hammersley (second round)
  Bill Talbert (finalist)
  Heraldo Weiss (first round)
  Pancho Segura (semifinals)
  Alejo Russell (quarterfinals)
  Gardnar Mulloy (second round)
  Ladislav Hecht (second round)
  Frank Shields (third round)
  Francisco Guerrero-Arcocha (second round)
  Elwood Cooke (semifinals)
  Henri Rochon (first round)
  Seymour Greenberg (quarterfinals)
  Brendan Macken (second round)
  Robert Falkenburg (quarterfinals)

Draw

Key
 Q = Qualifier
 WC = Wild card
 LL = Lucky loser
 r = Retired

Finals

Earlier rounds

Section 1

Section 2

Section 3

Section 4

References

External links
 1945 U.S. National Championships on ITFtennis.com, the source for this draw

Men's Singles
1945